Italy has yet to recognize Palestine as a sovereign state, partly due to a desire to await the outcome of the currently stalled negotiations, and partly due to the fact that the majority of European Union countries do not recognize it either. Nevertheless, Italy firmly backs the creation of the State of Palestine in accordance with the two-state solution. It also helps to fund UNRWA, which assists Palestinian refugees. Both nations are a part of the Union for the Mediterranean.

History 
The first contact between Italy and the PLO began in the 1960s. The Italian government was one of the first Western governments to establish relations with the Palestinian Liberation Organization (PLO). Since then, Italy has been a strong supporter of the Palestinian people and their right to self-determination. The relations between Italy and Palestine are based on economic, tourism, security, and education cooperation. For instance, Italy provides development assistance to the Palestinian Authority in order to help it build infrastructure and create jobs. In addition, Italy is a major tourist destination for Palestinians, and the two countries have worked together to improve security in the region. Finally, Italy has also provided scholarships for Palestinian students to study in Italian universities.

In 2013, the Italian Prime Minister, Enrico Letta, visited the Palestinian territories as part of a larger tour of the Middle East. Letta's visit was seen as an effort to promote peace in the region and to strengthen ties between Italy and the Palestinians.

On 27 February 2015, a non-binding resolution urging the government to recognize a Palestinian state was overwhelmingly passed by the Italian parliament.

References 

Palestine
Bilateral relations of the State of Palestine